The Naval Base Commander, Clyde  also known as the Commodore, Clyde Submarine Base is a senior British Royal Navy appointment first established in August 1967. The office holder is responsible for the command and administration of His Majesty's Naval Base Clyde. 

The current incumbent is Commodore Donald Doull.

History
The office was first created August 1967 with Commodore Derrick G. Kent being the first incumbent appointed. The post holder reported to the  Assistant Chief of the Naval Staff (Support) from December 2011 to January 2018. The post of ACNS (Support) has been renamed to Director of Naval Support to which this officer currently reports to.

Office Holders
Included:
 Commodore Derrick G. Kent: August 1967 – May 1969
 Commodore Peter G. La Niece: May 1969 – February 1971
 Commodore Peter E.C. Berger: February 1971 – August 1973
 Commodore Anthony J. Cooke: August 1973 – October 1975
 Commodore Alan J. Leahy: October 1975 – May 1978
 Commodore Colin N. MacEacharn: May 1978 – October 1980
 Commodore George M.F. Vallings: October 1980 – October 1982
 Commodore David H. Morse: October 1982 – October 1984
 Commodore David Pentreath: October 1984 – June 1986
 Commodore Patrick B. Rowe: June 1986 – December 1988
 Commodore Robert N. Woodard: December 1988 – June 1990
 Commodore David A.J. Blackburn: June 1990 – 1992
 Commodore Stuart M. Tickner: 1992
 Commodore John A. Trewby: March 1992 – February 1994
 Commodore B. Brian Perowne: February 1994 – 1996
 Commodore Frederick G. Thompson: 1996–1999
 Commodore Richard J. Lord: 1999 – January 2001
 Commodore K. John Borley: January 2001 – June 2004
 Commodore Carolyn J. Stait: June 2004 – October 2007
 Commodore Christopher J. Hockley: October 2007 – January 2011
 Commodore Michael P. Wareham: January 2011 – September 2013
 Commodore Keith A. Beckett: September 2013 – October 2014
 Commodore A.Mark Adams: October 2014 – February 2016
 Commodore Mark E. Gayfer: February 2016 – June 2018
 Commodore Donald Doull: June 2018 – June 2021
 Commodore Bob Anstey: June 2021-present

References

Royal Navy appointments
United Kingdom